Aunt Fanny may refer to:

People:
Pen name of Frances Dana Barker Gage, a leading American reformer, feminist and abolitionist
Pen name of Frances Elizabeth Barrow, a children's writer
Stage name of Fran Allison, television and radio comedian

Film:
Aunt Fanny, a character in Sporting Love (film)
Aunt Fanny, a character in Robots (2005 film)

Novels:
Aunt Fanny, a character in The Famous Five (novel series)
Aunt Fanny, a  character in The Cat Who...
Aunt Fanny, a  character in Gates of Paradise
Aunt Fanny, a  character in The Glass Village